Düzkaya Spor Kulübü is a Turkish Cypriot football club based in Çatalköy. The club play in Birinci Lig. The club was founded in Limassol in 1958, but had to be moved after the Turkish Invasion of Cyprus in 1974.

Colors
The club colors are red and white. Orange

Stadium
The club's home stadium is Çatalköy Nihat Bağcıer Stadı, which has a capacity of about 5,000 people.

References 

Football clubs in Northern Cyprus